Jessica Day George is an American author who lives in Utah. She is a New York Times bestselling author of Young Adult fantasy novels, and she received the 2007 Whitney Award for Best Book by a New Author for Dragon Slippers. Having attended Brigham Young University (BYU), George is a member of the Church of Jesus Christ of Latter-day Saints.

Biography
Jessica Day George was raised in Idaho. She later majored in Humanities and Comparative Literature at BYU. George also studied German, Norwegian, and Old Norse at BYU; she studied these languages so she could read Viking sagas in the original written language. Before she began writing full-time, she worked as a librarian and a bookseller. 

Her first publishing offer came from Bloomsbury Publishing for her first draft of Dragon Slippers. Dragon Slippers was published in 2007; she still continues to write for Bloomsbury Publishing. George also runs the website "Bookshop Talk", where she organizes and posts book reviews written by bloggers. George has been the keynote speaker for writer's workshops and teen writing conference. In 2009, George was profiled in the bimonthly periodical magazine Mormon Artist.

Her books and current published series include the Princess series,  the Dragonskin Slippers series, and the Castle Glower series, as well as the stand-alone book Sun and Moon, Ice and Snow.  Many of her stories are adaptations of classic fairy tales, and have received positive reviews from Kirkus Reviews, Booklist Online,<ref>[http://www.booklistonline.com/Sun-and-Moon-Ice-and-Snow-Jessica-Day-George/pid=2385502 '"Sun and Moon, Ice and Show"] review. Booklist Online. Frances Bradburn, February 1, 2008. Retrieved November 8, 2012.</ref> and others. George was on the New York Times bestseller list in May 2013 for Wednesdays in the Tower.

George is a member of The Church of Jesus Christ of Latter-day Saints.

Bibliography

Dragonskin Slippers seriesDragon Slippers (2006)Dragon Flight (2008)Dragon Spear (2009)

The Princesses of Westfalin seriesPrincess of the Midnight Ball (2009)Princess of Glass (2010)Princess of the Silver Woods (2012)

Castle Glower seriesTuesdays at the Castle (2011)Wednesdays in the Tower (2013)Thursdays with the Crown  (2014)Fridays with the Wizards (2015)Saturdays at Sea (2017)

The Rose Legacy seriesThe Rose Legacy (2018)The Queen's Secret (2019)The Rider's Reign (2020)

Standalone booksSun and Moon, Ice and Snow (2008)Silver in the Blood (2015)

Podcasts
She has contributed to the writing podcast Writing Excuses'' as a guest author several times.

Awards

See also
The Twelve Dancing Princesses
East of the Sun and West of the Moon

Notes

References

External links
  Author's website
 Jessica Day George papers, L. Tom Perry Special Collections, Harold B. Lee Library, Brigham Young University
Jessica Day George correspondence, 2006-2009, L. Tom Perry Special Collections, Harold B. Lee Library, Brigham Young University
Jessica Day George interviews, approximately 2009, L. Tom Perry Special Collections, Harold B. Lee Library, Brigham Young University
Jessica Day George literary manuscripts, 2007-2010, L. Tom Perry Special Collections, Harold B. Lee Library, Brigham Young University
Bookshop Talk
Author website at publisher Bloomsbury

1976 births
21st-century American novelists
21st-century American women writers
American women novelists
Brigham Young University alumni
Latter Day Saints from Idaho
Living people
Novelists from Idaho
Novelists from Utah
Writers from Salt Lake City
Harold B. Lee Library-related 21st century articles
American writers of young adult literature
Women writers of young adult literature
Writers from Boise, Idaho
American fantasy writers
Women science fiction and fantasy writers